Kaveh Alamouti (born 12 October 1954) is an Iranian-British investment banker. Alamouti holds a BSc in Engineering from the Imperial College London, and an MBA and a PhD in Finance from the London Business School, where he went on to serve as a member of the Faculty of Finance and Accounting.

In 1983 he joined Salomon Brothers.

Alamouti joined Tokai Bank in 1990 to establish an arbitrage group operating on a global basis. He was responsible for managing the overall risk and profitability of the Tokai Bank Europe Group in fixed income, foreign exchange, equities, credit spreads, and emerging markets.  There he served as Senior Managing Director of the Tokai Bank Europe and Head of Trading for the Tokai Bank Europe Group.

Alamouti incepted the Optimum Asset Management matrix in November 1999 to engage in asset management on a global basis. Following this, he was a Trader and Portfolio Manager at Moore Capital Management.

Between 2008 and 2014, Alamouti served as the Chief Executive Officer at Citadel Asset Management Europe.

References

Notes

Alumni of London Business School
Alumni of Imperial College London
Iranian businesspeople
Living people
British people of Iranian descent
1954 births